Y Gaer is a Roman fort situated near modern-day Brecon in Mid Wales, United Kingdom.

History 

Y Gaer was built around AD 75 and sits on a crossroads of Roman roads in the valley of the River Usk at a strategic point in Roman Wales, linking South Wales and Mid Wales. It was part of a chain of similar forts, such as Gobannium at Abergavenny, a day's march away down the Usk valley, and larger bases, such as Moridunum (Carmarthen) via Alabum (Llandovery), Cardiff Roman Fort to the south and Isca Augusta, Caerleon, the main base for the Roman legion locally.

The site was excavated in the 1920s by Sir Mortimer Wheeler, a prominent archaeologist of his day.

The fort was built for a contingent of up to 500 cavalrymen, recruited originally in Spain from the Vettones, and these Vettonian cavalry would have played a significant part in the conquest of the area held by the Silures.

Their early stables were wooden and their accommodation basic, protected by clay banks topped with a wooden palisade. This was rebuilt in the 2nd century AD by the Legio II Augusta and also shows signs of being repaired again in the 4th century.

Y Gaer today 

The site is in the care of Cadw. It lies on private farmland and Cadw provides no signposting to the site, which lies on the further side of the farm buildings at the end of the approach lane.

Several artifacts have been removed to local museums, such as a tombstone of a young cavalryman called Candidus, held at the Y Gaer cultural hub in Brecon.

See also
List of Cadw properties

References

External links 

Clwyd-Powys Archaeological Trust information on Y Gaer
Roman Britain: Y Gaer, Brecon (Cicucium)

Roman fortifications in Powys
Archaeological sites in Powys
Tourist attractions in Powys
Ruins in Wales
Cadw
Roman legionary fortresses in Wales